Douglas or Doug Davis may refer to:

Sports
Doug Davis (American football) (1944–2011), American football player
Doug Davis (infielder) (born 1962), American Major League Baseball infielder
Doug Davis (pitcher) (born 1975), American Major League Baseball pitcher

Others
Douglas Davis (artist) (1933–2014), American media artist and art writer 
Doug Davis (aviator) (1899–1934 or 1900–1934), American aviator, barnstormer and air racer
Doug Davis (businessman) (born 1974), music executive, sports agent and philanthropist
Doug E. Davis (born 1977), American politician
Doug E. Fresh (Douglas E. Davis, born 1966), American emcee, record producer and beat boxer

See also
Doug Davies (disambiguation)